Local elections were held in Bacoor on May 9, 2022, within the Philippine general election. Registered voters of the city will be electing candidates for the following elective local posts: the mayor, the vice mayor, the lone district representative, the two provincial board members for Cavite's second district, and the twelve councilors, six in each of the city's two local legislative districts.

Electoral System
Just like in any election in the Philippines, the electoral system is based on first-past-the-post voting.

Elections for mayor, vice mayor, lone district representative and the two board members are done at an at-large basis. Elections for members of the Sangguniang Panlungsod of Bacoor are via the electoral districts as defined by the city charter. It will be done via multiple non-transferable vote, with the candidates with six highest votes winning.

There are an additional two ex officio seats in the city council, for the city federation presidents of the Liga ng mga Barangay (village chairpersons' league) and the Sangguniang Kabataan (youth council league). These were originally elected in 2018, and whose terms were extended until 2022. Separate elections for these bodies will be in December 2022.

Background
Incumbent city mayor and former Cavite second district representative (2010-2016) Lani Mercado-Revilla, the winner of Bacoor's last hotly-contested elections in 2016, is not running for another term despite her being qualified to do so as she is only on her second term as city mayor, opting to vie for the open position of representative. She is swapping with her brother-in-law, incumbent district representative Edwin "Strike" Revilla, who is also on his second term in the said position. Strike's opponent will be Jose Francisco, who competed for the same position in 2019 but lost to Lani.

On the other hand, incumbent vice mayor Catherine Sariño-Evaristo is already on her third term as vice mayor (she was Strike Revilla's vice mayor on his last term in 2013) and is disqualified from re-election. She will be running instead city councilor for Bacoor West. Strike's older sister, incumbent West councilor and one-time Imus City, Cavite councilor in the 1990s Rowena Bautista-Mendiola, will be his running mate. Rowena will be opposed by Meliza Sison-Cubinar, who unsuccessfully ran for Bacoor West councilor in 2019.

Candidates

Team Revilla

Mayoralty and vice mayoralty elections

Congressional elections

Sangguniang Panlalawigan elections

Sangguniang Panlungsod elections

Bacoor West District

Bacoor East District

Notes

References

2022 Philippine local elections
May 2022 events in the Philippines
Elections in Bacoor
2022 elections in Calabarzon